Sproule may refer to:

Claire Sproule
 Daniel Sproule
 Dáithí Sproule
 Devon Sproule
 Harvey Sproule
 Ivan Sproule
 Paul Sproule
 Thomas Simpson Sproule
 William Sproule (?-1935), railroads

See also

 Claire Sproule (album)
 Sproul (disambiguation)